The South American Badminton Championships continental badminton championships are organised every year by the South American Badminton Confederation CONSUBAD (Confederación Sudamericana de Bádminton) only for South American badminton countries. Member countries are Argentina, Brazil, Chile, Colombia, Ecuador, Guyana, French Guiana, Panama, Paraguay, Peru, Suriname, and Venezuela. Former member was Uruguay. The council of the CONSUBA is now headed by President Raimundo Lizama of Chile, supported by Vice-President Chung Lee Kao of Paraguay and Secretary Alejandro Almada of Argentina.

Past adult individual South American winners

Adult South American Team Championships

Sources & External links

References

International badminton competitions
Sport in South America